List of rivers and creeks of Washington, D.C. (District of Columbia), sorted alphabetically.

 Anacostia River
 Barnaby Run
 Bennings Branch (historical)
 Bingham Run
 Broad Branch
 Davis Branch (historical)
 Deep Branch (historical)
 Duck Creek (historical)
 Dumbarton Oaks
 Fenwick Branch
 Fletchers Run
 Fort Chaplin Tributary
 Fort Dupont Tributary
 Fort Stanton Tributary
 Foundry Branch
 Gallatin Run
 Gillam Branch (historical)
 Hickey Run
 James Creek (historical)
 Klingle Run
 Lost Stream
 Lower Beaverdam Creek
 Luzon Branch
 Maddox Branch
 Melvin Hazen Valley Branch
 Milkhouse Run
 Nash Run
 Normanstone Creek
 Oxon Creek
 Oxon Run
 Pinehurst Branch
 Piney Branch
 Piney Run
 Pope Branch
 Portal Branch
 Potomac River
 Reedy Branch (historical)
 Rock Creek
 Soapstone Branch
 Stickfoot Branch
 Texas Avenue Tributary
 Tiber Creek (Goose Creek)
 Watts Branch
 Winkle Doodle Run

See also
Boundary Channel
Chesapeake and Ohio Canal
Washington Channel
Washington City Canal

Rivers

District